Events from the year 1909 in the United States.

Incumbents

Federal Government 
 President: Theodore Roosevelt (R-New York) (until March 4), William Howard Taft (R-Ohio) (starting March 4)
 Vice President: Charles W. Fairbanks (R-Indiana) (until March 4), James S. Sherman (R-New York) (starting March 4)
 Chief Justice: Melville Fuller (Illinois)
 Speaker of the House of Representatives: Joseph Gurney Cannon (R-Illinois)
 Congress: 60th (until March 4), 61st (starting March 4)

Events

January–March

 January 1–31 – Torrential rain in California sees Helena Mine record  of precipitation for the month, the highest official monthly total in the contiguous United States.
 January 1 – Drilling begins on the Lakeview Gusher.
 January 28 – U.S. troops leave Cuba after being there since the Spanish–American War.
 February 2 – Centennial anniversary of the foundation of Miami University (Ohio), which is celebrated.
 February 12 – The National Association for the Advancement of Colored People (NAACP) is founded, commemorating the hundredth anniversary of Abraham Lincoln's birth.
 February 13 – Superior National Forest is established
 February 22 – The Great White Fleet returns to Hampton Roads, Virginia having circumnavigated the globe.
 February 24 – The Hudson Motor Car Company is founded.
 March 4 – William Howard Taft is sworn in as the 27th President of the United States, and James S. Sherman is sworn in as Vice President of the United States.
 March 23 – Theodore Roosevelt leaves New York for the Smithsonian-Roosevelt African Expedition, sponsored by the Smithsonian Institution and National Geographic Society.

April–June
 April 30 – Palm Beach County was founded, separating from Dade County.
 June 1 – The Alaska–Yukon–Pacific Exposition opens in Seattle.
 June 9–August 7 – Alice Huyler Ramsey, a 22-year-old housewife and mother from Hackensack, New Jersey, becomes the first woman to drive across the United States. In 59 days, she drives a Maxwell automobile 3,800 miles from Manhattan, New York to San Francisco, California with three non-driving female companions. 
 June 18 – The strangled body of missionary Elsie Sigel is discovered in a trunk in New York City's Chinatown.
 June 22 – Construction begins on the Cape Cod Canal, which will separate Cape Cod from mainland Massachusetts.

July–September
 August 2
 The United States Army Signal Corp Division purchases the world's first military airplane. They buy the Wright Military Flyer from the Wright Brothers.
 The US Mint releases the 1909-S VDB Lincoln Cent, discontinuing it on August 5 because it shows the initials of engraver Victor David Brenner.
 August 8 – The Rosicrucian Fellowship is launched at Seattle, Washington.
 August 12 – The first event is held at Indianapolis Motor Speedway.
 September – Sigmund Freud, having arrived on August 29 in New York, delivers his only lectures in the United States, on psychoanalysis, at Clark University, Worcester, Massachusetts, giving public recognition to the subject in the anglophone world.
 September 27 – The 5.1  Wabash River earthquake shook western Indiana with a maximum Mercalli intensity of VII (Very strong), causing light damage.

October–December

 October 11 – The 1909 Florida Keys hurricane makes landfall in the U.S.
 November – New York shirtwaist strike of 1909 begins.
 November 2 – The Lambda Chi Alpha fraternity is founded at Boston University.
 November 6 – The Union Soldiers and Sailors Monument is dedicated in Baltimore.
 November 8 – Fire at Robert Morrison fibroid comb factory in New York City kills 9.
 November 11 – The U.S. Navy founds a navy base in Pearl Harbor, Hawaii.
 November 13 – Ballinger–Pinchot scandal begins: Collier's Magazine accuses U.S. Secretary of the Interior Richard Ballinger of questionable dealings in Alaskan coal fields.
 November 18 – Two United States Navy ships are sent to Nicaragua after 500 revolutionaries (including 2 Americans) are executed by order of dictator José Santos Zelaya.
 December 31 – The Manhattan Bridge opens.

Undated
 The American Issue Publishing House of the Anti-Saloon League is incorporated.

Ongoing
 Progressive Era (1890s–1920s)
 Lochner era (c. 1897–c. 1937)
 Black Patch Tobacco Wars (1904–1909)
 Great White Fleet voyage (1907–1909)

Births
 January 1 – Dana Andrews, film actor (died 1992)
 January 2 – Barry Goldwater, U.S. Senator from Arizona from 1953 to 1965 and from 1969 to 1987 (died 1998)
 January 4 – J. R. Simplot, businessman, founded the Simplot Company (died 2008)
 January 5 – Stephen Cole Kleene, mathematician (died 1994)
 February 11
 Max Baer, boxer (died 1959)
 Joseph L. Mankiewicz, filmmaker (died 1993)
 January 30 – Saul Alinsky, community organizer (died 1972)
 February 9 – Dean Rusk, politician (died 1994)
 February 18 – Warren Elliot Henry, African American physicist (died 2001)
 February 24 – August Derleth, writer and anthologist (died 1971)
 March 4 – Harry Helmsley, real estate entrepreneur (died 1997)
 March 7 – Roger Revelle, scientist (died 1991)
 March 12 – Virginia McLaurin, community worker and supercentenarian (died 2022)
 March 24 – Clyde Barrow, outlaw (died 1934)
 April 13 – Eudora Welty, fiction writer (died 2001)
 May 7 – Edwin H. Land, camera inventor (died 1991)
 May 15 – J. Caleb Boggs, U.S. Senator from Delaware from 1961 to 1973 (died 1993)
 May 27 – Dolores Hope, born Dolores L. DeFina, singer and philanthropist (died 2011)
 May 30 – Benny Goodman, jazz clarinetist and bandleader (died 1986)
 June 3 – Ira D. Wallach, businessman and philanthropist (died 2007)
 June 12 – Archie Bleyer, song arranger and bandleader (died 1989)
 June 14 – Burl Ives, folk singer (died 1995 in the United States)
 July 11 – Irene Hervey, actress (died 1998)
 July 29 – Chester Himes, fiction writer (died 1984)
 August 1 – Sibyl M. Rock, mathematician (died 1981)
 August 10 – Leo Fender, guitar inventor and manufacturer (died 1991)
 September 12 – Lawrence Brooks, army veteran and supercentenarian (died 2022)
 September 28 – Al Capp, cartoonist (died 1979)
 October 1 – Everett Sloane, character actor (died 1965)
 October 13 – Herblock, editorial cartoonist (died 2001)
 October 14 – Dorothy Kingsley, screenwriter and producer (died 1997)
 November 7 – Ruby Hurley, civil rights activist (died 1980)
 November 18 – Johnny Mercer, songwriter (died 1976)
 November 20 – Alan Bible, U.S. Senator from Nevada from 1954 to 1974 (died 1988)
 November 27 – James Agee, writer (died 1955)
 December 9  –  Douglas Fairbanks, Jr., film actor (died 2000)
 December 14 – Edward Lawrie Tatum, geneticist, Nobel Prize laureate (died 1975)

Deaths
 January 10
 John Conness, Ireland-born U.S. Senator from California from 1863 to 1869 (born 1821)
 Charles Vernon Culver, politician (born 1830)
 April 9 – Francis Marion Crawford, novelist (born 1854)
 April 21 – David Turpie, U.S. Senator from Indiana in 1863 and from 1887 to 1899 (born 1828)
 April 23 – Franklin Bartlett, Representative from New York (born 1847)
 April 28 – Frederick Holbrook, 27th Governor of Vermont from 1861 to 1863 (born 1813)
 May 17 – Helge Alexander Haugan, Norwegian-born banking executive (born 1847)
 June 10 – Gideon T. Stewart, educator and politician (born 1824)
 June 24 – Sarah Orne Jewett, writer (born 1849)
 June 29 – George B. Cosby, Confederate general in the American Civil War (born 1830)
 August 21 – George Cabot Lodge, poet (born 1873)
 September 4 – Clyde Fitch, dramatist (born 1865)
 October 15 – William Lindsay, U.S. Senator from Kentucky from 1893 to 1901 (born 1835)
 December 10 – Red Cloud, Oglala Lakota Chief (born 1822)
 December 20 – William Alexander Harris, U.S. Senator from Kansas from 1897 to 1903 (born 1841)
 December 24 – Jean Clemens, youngest child of Mark Twain (born 1880)
 December 26 – Frederic Remington, cowboy artist and sculptor (born 1864)

See also
 List of American films of 1909
 Timeline of United States history (1900–1929)

References

External links
 

 
1900s in the United States
United States
United States
Years of the 20th century in the United States